Roy J. Stuart, Jr. (July 25, 1920 – February 27, 2013) was a professional American football player in the National Football League (NFL).  He played guard for the Cleveland Rams, Detroit Lions, and (after serving in World War II) the Buffalo Bisons of the All-America Football Conference.

Stuart graduated from Shawnee High School in 1938 where he was an All-State football player. He then played college football at the University of Tulsa, on  both offense and defense and was named the outstanding lineman in Tulsa's first bowl game (the 1941 Sun Bowl).

He played professionally for two years then went into the navy in 1943. He was part of the Norman Okla Naval Air Station Zoomers football team before being assigned aboard ship. He was on the USS Bunker Hill when it suffered a Kamikaze attack. Nearly 700 sailors and airmen were killed, injured or missing.   After the war he played another year of pro football then returned to his hometown of Shawnee and became the head football coach for one year. He then worked in the oil business in Tulsa. Stuart was elected to Tulsa's athletic hall of fame in 1993.

Footnotes

External links 
Roy Stuart at NFL.com
Roy Stuart at Pro-Football-Reference.com

1920 births
2013 deaths
Tulsa Golden Hurricane football players
Sportspeople from Shawnee, Oklahoma
Buffalo Bisons (AAFC) players
Cleveland Rams players
Detroit Lions players
Shawnee High School (Oklahoma) alumni